Jacqueline Carol LaVine (born October 4, 1929) is an American former competition swimmer and Olympic medalist.

LaVine won her first medal in international competition, a gold, at the 1951 Pan American Games in Buenos Aires, Argentina.  She was a member of the winning U.S. team in the women's 4×100-meter freestyle relay which included teammates Carolyn Green, Betty Mullen and Sharon Geary.  Individually, she also won a silver medal for her second-place finish in the women's 100-meter freestyle.

One year later, LaVine represented the United States at the 1952 Summer Olympics in Helsinki, Finland.  She received a bronze medal as a member of the third-place U.S. team in women's 4×100-meter freestyle relay, together with American teammates Marilee Stepan, Jody Alderson and Evelyn Kawamoto.

See also
 List of Olympic medalists in swimming (women)

References

General
 

1929 births
Living people
American female freestyle swimmers
Olympic bronze medalists for the United States in swimming
Sportspeople from Maywood, Illinois
Swimmers at the 1951 Pan American Games
Swimmers at the 1952 Summer Olympics
Medalists at the 1952 Summer Olympics
Pan American Games gold medalists for the United States
Pan American Games silver medalists for the United States
Pan American Games medalists in swimming
Medalists at the 1951 Pan American Games
21st-century American women